The Buckskin Range is a mountain range in Douglas County, Nevada.

References 

Mountain ranges of Nevada
Mountain ranges of Douglas County, Nevada